Nehuen Montoya (born 11 February 1998) is an Argentine professional footballer who plays as a defender for Chacarita Juniors.

Career
Montoya got his career underway with Chacarita Juniors in Primera B Nacional. A fixture at the Estadio Chacarita Juniors with Sarmiento on 23 February 2019 allowed Montoya to make his debut in professional football, playing the full duration of a 1–3 loss; he had previously been an unused substitute three times that month.

Career statistics
.

References

External links

1998 births
Living people
Place of birth missing (living people)
Argentine footballers
Association football defenders
Primera Nacional players
Chacarita Juniors footballers